Lemuel Whiting Joiner (November 9, 1810October 22, 1886) was an American farmer, Republican politician, and Wisconsin pioneer.  He served six years in the Wisconsin State Senate and one year in the State Assembly, representing Iowa County.  His son, Robert Joiner, also served in the Legislature.

Biography
Joiner was born in 1810 in Royalton, Vermont. He moved to Cincinnati in 1830 and then to Williamsport, Indiana in 1834.  In 1845 he moved to Wyoming, Iowa County, Wisconsin, which was his primary residence for the rest of his life. Joiner died on October 22, 1886.

Joiner's son, Robert, also served in the Senate.

Career
Joiner was elected to the Assembly in 1853. He was later a member of the Senate three times. First, from 1857 to 1858, second, from 1861 to 1862 and third, from 1869 to 1870. He was a Republican.

References

External links
 

People from Royalton, Vermont
People from Wyoming, Iowa County, Wisconsin
Republican Party Wisconsin state senators
1810 births
1886 deaths
19th-century American politicians
Republican Party members of the Wisconsin State Assembly